Charlie Williams (born in Kelsall, Cheshire) is a former Grand Prix motorcycle road racer. His best season was in 1974 when he finished in tenth place in the 500cc world championship on a Yamaha motorcycle. Williams was a nine-time winner at the Isle of Man TT races, although only three of those victories counted towards the world championship. In 1980, he won the Formula II Class of the Formula TT world championship.

Since racing, Williams has remained a TT personality presenting the breakfast show every week day on Radio TT as well as joining the team for trackside commentary. He owns and has taken an active role in running the Chester store Everything But Bikes since retiring from TT racing.

Motorcycle Grand Prix results

(key) (Races in bold indicate pole position)

References

Living people
People from Cheshire West and Chester
British motorcycle racers
English motorcycle racers
125cc World Championship riders
250cc World Championship riders
350cc World Championship riders
500cc World Championship riders
Isle of Man TT riders
Sportspeople from Cheshire
Year of birth missing (living people)